Queen Elizabeth Hospital may refer to one of several institutions named after Queen Elizabeth I, Queen Elizabeth II or Queen Elizabeth the Queen Mother:

United Kingdom 
Queen Elizabeth Hospital Birmingham, England
Queen Elizabeth's Hospital, a school in Clifton, Bristol, England
Queen Elizabeth Hospital, Gateshead, Tyne and Wear, England
Queen Elizabeth University Hospital, Glasgow, Scotland
Queen Elizabeth Hospital for Children, London (Bethnal Green), England
Queen Elizabeth Hospital, King's Lynn, Norfolk, England
Queen Elizabeth Hospital, London (Woolwich), England
New QEII Hospital, Welwyn Garden City, Hertfordshire, England

Canada 
Queen Elizabeth II Health Sciences Centre, Nova Scotia
Queen Elizabeth Hospital (Charlottetown), Prince Edward Island
Queen Elizabeth Hospital, Toronto
Queen Elizabeth Hospital, a hospital in Montreal, closed 1995
Queen Elizabeth II Hospital Emergency Department, Grande Prairie

Elsewhere
The Queen Elizabeth Hospital, Adelaide, Australia
Queen Elizabeth Hospital, Bridgetown, Barbados
Queen Elizabeth Hospital, Hong Kong
Queen Elizabeth Hospital, Kota Kinabalu, Malaysia

See also 
 List of things named after Queen Elizabeth II#Hospitals and health
QEH (disambiguation)
Queen Elizabeth Health Complex, Montreal